Call Me Madam is a musical written by Howard Lindsay and Russel Crouse, with music and lyrics by Irving Berlin.

The musical is a satire on politics and foreign policy that spoofs postwar America's penchant for lending billions of dollars to needy countries. It centers on Sally Adams, a well-meaning but ill-informed socialite widow, who is appointed United States Ambassador to the fictional European country of "Lichtenburg". Signs in Lichtenburg are written in German, and inhabitants wear traditional Bavarian costume. While there, she charms the local gentry, especially Cosmo Constantine, while her press attaché Kenneth Gibson falls in love with Princess Maria of Lichtenburg.

Background
The lead character is based on Washington, D.C. hostess and Democratic Party fundraiser Perle Mesta, who was appointed Ambassador to Luxembourg in 1949. The Playbill distributed at each performance humorously noted that "neither the character of Mrs. Sally Adams nor Miss Ethel Merman resemble any person living or dead."

In 1949, Merman and her family were vacationing at the Hotel Colorado in Glenwood Springs with Howard Lindsay and his wife, Dorothy Stickney. Watching Merman at poolside, while he was reading a magazine article about Mesta, Lindsay was struck by how typically "American" Merman was, and immediately envisioned her portraying a colorful character similar to the newly-appointed ambassador. When he proposed the idea to Merman, who had little interest in either society or political news, she responded, "Who's Perle Mesta?"

Although Merman had announced she was interested in playing a dramatic role in her next project, Lindsay and Russel Crouse approached Irving Berlin and began working on the book for Call Me Madam when Berlin expressed interest in composing the score. Berlin's last production, Miss Liberty, had failed to recoup its investment, and he was determined to repeat the success he had had with Annie Get Your Gun. The three collaborators agreed they needed to treat their subject with care, to avoid any legal action by Mesta. As the work progressed, Merman conceded she would be willing to sing two or three songs, but eventually accepted the fact she was going to star in a full-scale musical comedy, instead of the drama she preferred.

Producer Leland Hayward budgeted the production at $250,000. In exchange for the original cast recording and television broadcast rights, he arranged to have it financed 100% by RCA Records and NBC, with the two sharing 35% of the net earnings. In order to increase the profits, Hayward decided to charge an all-time high of $7.20 for orchestra seats.

Hayward hired George Abbott to direct, and Abbott and casting director Harold Prince auditioned thousands of actors for the twenty speaking roles and twenty-nine chorus members. Raoul Pene du Bois was hired to design sets and costumes, while the wardrobe worn by Merman was the responsibility of Mainbocher.

Once the script was completed, everyone agreed that, while it seemed originally little more than standard situation comedy material—although as the years have transpired, many musical aficionados rate it much higher—it was a perfect vehicle for Merman, and that Berlin's score, raised to its pinnacle by Merman, was tuneful and memorable. Berlin wrote "Something to Dance About" to give the second act a lively opening. When the star requested a duet with Russell Nype playing her lovestruck press attaché, Berlin responded by writing the counterpoint tune "You're Just in Love" and it ultimately became a showstopper at every performance.

Productions
Directed by George Abbott and choreographed by Jerome Robbins, the musical premiered at the Shubert Theatre in New Haven, Connecticut on September 11, 1950. Reviews were mixed - Variety said it "inspires warm applause rather than cheer"—and Berlin wrote two new songs to bolster the sagging second act. It opened in Boston on September 19, and while The Boston Record thought it offered "only an occasional flash of inspirational fire", it played to standing-room-only audiences throughout the run.

With a record advance sale of $2 million, the Broadway production opened on October 12 at the Imperial Theatre, where it ran for 644 performances and grossed more than $4 million. In addition to Merman and Nype, the cast included Paul Lukas, Pat Harrington, Sr., Galina Talva, Lilia Skala, Tommy Rall and Richard Eastham. Brooks Atkinson of The New York Times thought it offered one of Berlin's "most enchanting scores: fresh, light, and beguiling, and fitted to lyrics that fall out of it with grace and humor", and the New York Post called Merman "indescribably soul-satisfying", "a comedienne of rare skill", and "one of the joys of the world." She remained with the show for the entire run and appeared in the limited four-week engagement staged to celebrate the reopening of the National Theatre in Washington, D.C.

Apart from playing Rose in the first national tour of Gypsy, the role of Sally Adams in Call Me Madam would be the only stage role which Ethel Merman would reprise after originating it on Broadway. In July 1965 Merman would headline a revival by the Valley Music Theater in which Richard Eastham and Russell Nype also reprised their Broadway roles. The production played an encore engagement - without Nype - in Houston that October. Merman, Eastham and Nype again reprised their Broadway roles for a 1967 summer stock tour of Call Me Madam.

The national tour of Call Me Madam was headlined by Elaine Stritch; Merman's understudy during the show's Broadway run, Stritch had never had occasion to perform as Sally Adams at the Imperial, her debut in the role being at a matinee performance during the show's May 1952 Washington D.C. engagement. Subsequent to engagements at the Nixon Theater in Pittsburgh and the Hanna Theatre in Cleveland - with respective openings on June 2 and June 9, 1952 - the Call Me Madam national tour opened at the Philharmonic Auditorium June 23, 1952 with further engagements in nine other cities - including Chicago and Detroit - the finale being an engagement at the Iroquois Park Amphitheater in Louisville in August 1953. Throughout most of the tour Stritch's leading man was Kent Smith, as Cosmo Constantine, although Dick Smart would take over the role before the tour's end. The cast of the national tour also included Pat Harrington, Sr. and Jay Velie reprising their Broadway roles. Stritch would reprise the role of Sally Adams in two regional theatrical productions, headlining Call Me Madam for St. Louis Municipal Opera Theatre in 1954 - with Russell Nype reprising his Broadway role - and for the Valley Forge Music Fair in 1956.

Call Me Madam returned to the New York stage for the first time since its original Broadway run via the New York City Center Encores! semi-staged concert version - with Tyne Daly headlining a cast including Walter Charles as Cosmo Constantine, Lewis Cleale as Kenneth and Melissa Errico as Princess Maria. Presented in February 1995  as the inaugural production of Encores! second season, Call Me Madam was lauded as the company's first hit production. Encores! would present a fully-staged production of Call Me Madam in February 2019, with Carmen Cusack headlining a cast which included Darrell Hammond as Grand Duke Otto, Carol Kane as Grand Duchess Sophie, Stanley Wayne Mathis as Senator Borckbank, Randy Rainbow as Sebastian Sebastian, and Lauren Worsham as Princess Maria.

Call Me Madam had its premiere regional theatrical engagement at the Dallas State Fair in August 1952: with Joan Blondell headlining and Russell Nype reprising his Broadway role, the cast also included William LeMassena as Pemberton Maxwell, Michael Pollock as Sebastian Sebastian and Gene Raymond as Cosmo Constantine. In 1959 Constance Bennett would headline a production of Call Me Madam, featuring Wilbur Evans as Cosmo Constantine, which played engagements at the Camden County Music Fair and at the Storrowtown Music Fair. Also in 1959 Penny Singleton would headline a 1959 production by the St. Louis Municipal Opera Theatre in which both Russell Nype and Pat Harrington, Sr. reprised their Broadway roles. Wilbur Evans would reprise the role of Cosmo Constantine in a 1963 production headlined by Martha Raye which played engagements at the Valley Forge Music Fair and at the Storrowtown Music Fair, with Kenneth Gibson being played by James Kirkwood. Margaret Whiting, who headlined a 1961 production of Call Me Madam which played engagements in Boston and New Jersey, would in 1966 headline the play's Melody Top summer stock production in Milwaukee which featured Tommy Sands as Kenneth Gibson.

Jo Anne Worley, who headlined the 1987 Pasadena Convention Center production of Call Me Madam, would also headline a semi-staged concert version mounted in 2001 at the Auditorium Theatre (Chicago) with Malcolm Gets as Kenneth Gibson and Fred Willard. Leslie Uggams would headline a revival of Call Me Madam mounted at the Paper Mill Playhouse, Millburn, New Jersey, in April–May 1996: the additional cast included J. B. Adams as Henry Gibson/ Grand Duke Otto, Mark Baker as Pemberton Maxwell, and Vanessa Dorman as Princess Maria. In September 2000 Call Me Madam was mounted at the UCLA Freud Playhouse with Karen Morrow headlining a cast which included Robert Mandan as Pemberton Maxwell, Michael Nouri as Cosmo Constantine, Hugh Panaro as Kenneth Gibson, and Michael Tucci as Congressman Wilkins.

Other regional productions of Call Me Madam have been headlined by Maxene Andrews (Coachlight Dinner Theater East Windsor CT/ 1976), Klea Blackhurst (42nd Street Moon San Francisco/ 2009), Kim Criswell with Catherine Brunell as Princess Maria  and David Hess as Cosmo Constantine (Goodspeed Musicals Middlesex County CT/ 2004), Ruta Lee (Casa Mañana Fort Worth/ 1978), and Helen Reddy with Monte Markham as Cosmo Constantine (Sacramento Civic Light Opera/ 1986).

Call Me Madam opened in the West End at the London Coliseum on March 15, 1952 for a run of 486 performances: Billie Worth headlined a cast which included Anton Walbrook as Cosmo Constantine and Shani Wallis - in her first major stage role - as Princess Maria. Noele Gordon - who had understudied Worth during the Coliseum run of Call Me Madam - headlined the production's British touring edition in 1953 and in 1983 would headline a West End revival whose cast also included Jeremy Hawk as Pemberton Maxwell and Basil Hoskins as Cosmo Constantine: opening March 14, 1983, the production was afforded a seven-week run at the Victoria Palace. Call Me Madam has since had two evident London fringe productions, the first at Upstairs at The Gatehouse in the summer of 2009 with Thom Southerland directing a cast which included Beverley Klein as Sally Adams, Chris Love as Kenneth Gibson, Kate Nelson as Princess Maria, and Gido Schimanski as Cosmo Constantine. Subsequently, the Union Theatre, London would mount Call Me Madam in the fall of 2012: staged and directed by Michael Strassen, the production - headlined by Lucy Williamson leading as cast which included Gavin Kerr, Leo Miles and Natalie Lipin - received five nominations at the Off West End Awards and was named as one of the productions when the Union won Best Fringe at The Stage Awards in 2013 alongside The Globe (Best Theatre).

Call Me Madam began its inaugural Australian engagement on September 5, 1953 at Her Majesty's Theatre, Melbourne: with Evie Hayes headlining a cast which also included David Cahill as Hugo Tantinnin and Alec Kellaway as Congressman Wilkins, the production would play subsequent engagement in Brisbane and Sydney. Revived in 1985 at the Canberra Theatre with June Bronhill headlining and David Branson featured as Cosmo Constantine, Call Me Madam would in 2000 be mounted at the Arts Centre Melbourne with Geraldine Turner headlining a cast which included Rachael Beck as Princess Maria, Reg Gorman as Congressman Wilkins, and Spencer McLaren as Kenneth Gibson.

Film adaptation

A 1953 20th Century Fox film adaptation stars Ethel Merman, George Sanders, Donald O'Connor, Billy DeWolfe, Charles Dingle, and Vera-Ellen.

Casts

Musical numbers

Act I
 "Mrs. Sally Adams"–Company
 "The Hostess With the Mostes' on the Ball"–Sally
 "Washington Square Dance"–Sally and Company
 "Lichtenburg"–Cosmo and Singers
 "Can You Use Any Money Today?"–Sally
 "Marrying For Love"–Cosmo and Sally
 "The Ocarina"–Princess Maria and Company
 "It's a Lovely Day Today"–Kenneth and Princess Maria
 "The Best Thing for You (Would Be Me)"–Sally and Cosmo

Act II
 "Lichtenburg" (Reprise)–Cosmo and Singers
 "Something To Dance About"–Sally and Company
 "Once Upon a Time Today"–Kenneth
 "They Like Ike"–Congressman Wilkins, Senator Gallagher, and Senator Brockbank
 "You're Just in Love"–Sally and Kenneth
 "The Best Thing for You (Would Be Me)" (Reprise)–Sally and Cosmo
 "It's a Lovely Day Today" (Reprise)–Kenneth and Princess Maria
 "Mrs. Sally Adams" (Reprise)–Company
 "Finale"–Sally and Company

Recordings
In a highly unusual situation, two LP albums of the score were released. The recording rights had been granted to RCA Victor, which had invested in the show, but Merman was under contract to Decca Records, which refused to allow her to record the original cast album. Decca issued a 10-inch LP featuring Merman singing some of her songs, accompanied by arranger-conductor Gordon Jenkins and His Orchestra and Chorus, with vocalizing by Dick Haymes (who joined Merman in the show's biggest hit, "You're Just in Love", their single reaching Billboard magazine's number 30 for a week) and Eileen Wilson (who sang "It's a Lovely Day Today" with Haymes). RCA Victor went ahead with the original cast album, replacing Merman with Dinah Shore.

Merman was called back into the Decca studios to record additional songs from the show, and the label quickly re-released the album as a 12-inch LP, under the title Ethel Merman: 12 Songs from Call Me Madam. The Victor album sold reasonably well, attaining the sixth spot on the Billboard popular album charts, but the LP was out of print from 1956 until RCA Red Seal reissued it briefly in 1977. Peaking at number two on Billboards popular album charts, Merman's Decca recording, which would appear on MCA Records beginning in 1973, stayed steadily in print until the end of the LP era. Merman's Madam album was most recently available on a Decca Broadway CD, which also features Merman singing four Cole Porter tunes from the stage score of Panama Hattie (1940).

Merman also is heard on the film soundtrack album (with Donald O'Connor and George Sanders), issued in 1953 as a 10-inch album, also on the Decca label. Scoring fifth position on Billboard's popular albums charts when first released, the soundtrack, taken out of print in 1957, was reissued in 1981 by Stet Records on a 12-inch LP which also contained songs from the film scores of Guys and Dolls (1955) and I'll Cry Tomorrow (1955). The Merman soundtrack has not been legally issued on CD.

A 1995 Broadway concert cast album, featuring Tyne Daly, Lewis Cleale, Christopher Durang, Ken Page, and Melissa Errico, is available on the DRG label.

The original London West End cast recording, starring Billie Worth and Anton Walbrook, has been released on the Sepia label.

Promotional appearances
On the premiere episode of NBC Radio's The Big Show on November 5, 1950, original Broadway cast members Ethel Merman, Paul Lukas, and Russell Nype appeared in the first half-hour (of the hour-and-a-half program) and performed songs from the score in order of their appearance in the production, while host Tallulah Bankhead filled in story notes between songs (although accidentally missing one story cue). Merman sang "The Hostess With the Mostes' on the Ball," then Lukas sang "Lichtenburg," then Merman sang "Can You Use Any Money Today?" and "The Best Thing for You (Would Be Me)". Finally, Merman sang "You're Just in Love" with Nype.

In political culture
Known as "Madam Speaker", when United Kingdom's Betty Boothroyd was assigned the chair of Deputy Speaker (1987 - 1992), backbencher Peter Pike asked her: "What do we call you?" and drawing from her show business years, Boothroyd replied: "Call me Madam."

Awards

References

Dietz, Dan. The Complete Book of 1950s Broadway Musicals (2014), Bowman & Littlefield, p. 34

External links

Call Me Madam at guidetomusicaltheatre.com

Musicals by Irving Berlin
1950 musicals
Broadway musicals
Musicals choreographed by Jerome Robbins
Musicals by Lindsay and Crouse
Tony Award-winning musicals